William B. Kerr Co. was a manufacturer of jewelry, flatware and hollow-ware. Established in Newark, New Jersey in 1855, they are listed in the 1915 Edition of the Trademarks of the Jewelry and Kindred Trades as having been located at 144 Orange St.

Hallmark

Kerr's hallmark was a fasces - a single-bit axe with rods bound with straps.  They used this trademark of a medieval axe from 1855 until 1892.  Other hallmarks include a hammer, and three "X" marks.
William B. Kerr & Co.
newark, New Jersey Ca. 1880s - 1927
Well regarded for Art Nouveau jewelry, holloware and vanity items.
Absorbed into Gorham in 1927.

Styles
Kerr was known for elaborate and unique Art Nouveau pieces, most especially the American Beauty series, as well as many different patterns of flatware and holloware for children featuring nursery rhymes and images.

Sale to Gorham

William B. Kerr & Co was sold to Gorham Manufacturing Company.  Gorham was purchased by Textron in 1967.  Gorham was owned by Brown-Forman Corporation from 1991 to 2005 until it was sold to Department 56 in the Lenox holdings transaction.

Notes and references

 "Silver in America, 1840-1940" - Magazine Antiques,  December 1994  by Charles L. Venable
 Gorham Silver, 1831-1981 - N.Y., Dodd, Mead, 1983, by Charles H. Carpenter

External links
Gorham history

American silversmiths
Manufacturing companies based in New Jersey